Mường Nhà is a commune (xã) and village of the Điện Biên District of Điện Biên Province, northwestern Vietnam. It lies north by road from Mường Lói. The commune has problems with narcotics smuggling and addiction, being located near the Laotian border.

References

Communes of Điện Biên province
Populated places in Điện Biên province